Esashika (written: 江刺家) is a Japanese surname. Notable people with the surname include:

, Japanese ice hockey player
, Japanese bobsledder

Japanese-language surnames